Ilha Solteira is a municipality in the state of São Paulo in Brazil. The population is 26,788 (2020 est.) in an area of 653 km². The elevation is 335 m. The nearby Ilha Solteira Dam created a reservoir in the Paraná River.

References

 
Populated places established in 1968